The European road E373 or E373 is a European road running from Lublin in Poland to Kyiv in Ukraine.

General 
The European road E373 is a Class B connection road and connects the Polish city Lublin with the Ukrainian city Kyiv which makes it at a length of approximately 590 kilometers. The route has been recorded by the UNECE as follows: Lublin - Kovel - Kyiv.

Route 
 
 : Lublin - Chełm (Lublin-Piaski concurrent with European route E372)
 
: Kovel - Kyiv

External links 
 UN Economic Commission for Europe: Overall Map of E-road Network (2007)

373
E373
European routes in Ukraine